Adinath Temple, located on the summit of Mainak Hill on Maheshkhali Island off the coast of Cox's Bazar, Bangladesh, is dedicated to the Hindu God, Shiva, who is worshipped as Adinath. The temple is famous for the annual fair held at the foot of Mainak Hill in the month of Phalgun as per the Bengali calendar. The fair, which lasts 13 days, draws thousands of Hindus from across Bangladesh.

Gallery

References

Further reading
 
 
 

Shiva temples
Hindu temples in Cox's Bazar District